Frederick J. Howard (1893 – after 1924) was an English footballer. He played in Wales with Mid Rhondda, Pontypridd, Wrexham, and Welshpool Town; in Scotland with Dundee Hibernian, Ayr United, and Clyde; and in England with Manchester City, Port Vale, and New Brighton.

Career
Howard was born in Walkden and played youth football with Walkden Wednesday, before starting his professional career with Manchester City in 1912. He hit 12 goals in 16 First Division games in 1912–13, including all four in a 4–1 win over Liverpool at Hyde Road. He bagged 14 goals in 35 appearances in 1913–14, including a hat-trick against Derby County at the Baseball Ground. He scored 18 goals in 36 games in 1914–15 to become the club's top scorer. He scored a total of 40 goals in 79 league games. This total probably would have been much higher if it were not for World War I. He did remain in Manchester for part of the 1915–16 season, scoring four goals in seven games.

After leaving City in 1919 he played for Welsh sides Mid Rhondda and Pontypridd, before heading to Scotland with Dundee Hibernian, Ayr United (on trial) and Clyde.

Howard returned to England in July 1923, signing with Second Division side Port Vale. He played 12 games in the 1923–24 season, and scored two goals in a 4–3 defeat to Crystal Palace at The Old Recreation Ground on 1 September. His stay in Burslem was short though, and after losing his first team place in November 1923 he was given a free transfer to New Brighton of the Third Division North. He later moved back to Wales to play for Wrexham, Welshpool Town and Holyhead Town.

Career statistics
Source:

References

1893 births
Year of death missing
People from Walkden
English footballers
Association football forwards
Manchester City F.C. players
Mid Rhondda F.C. players
Pontypridd F.C. players
Dundee United F.C. players
Ayr United F.C. players
Clyde F.C. players
Port Vale F.C. players
New Brighton A.F.C. players
Wrexham A.F.C. players
Welshpool Town F.C. players
Holyhead Town F.C. players
English Football League players
Scottish Football League players